Oh, Mabel Behave is a 1922 American silent comedy film starring Mabel Normand, Owen Moore, Mack Sennett, and Ford Sterling. Sennett and Sterling also directed the film.

This film was likely filmed in 1915 or 1916 as it is listed as produced by Triangle Film Corporation, which was defunct by 1922.

Cast
 Mabel Normand as Innkeeper's Daughter
 Owen Moore as Randolph Roanoke
 Mack Sennett as Blaa Blaa
 Ford Sterling as Squire Peachem
 Alice Davenport as The Innkeeper's Wife
 Fontaine La Rue as The Barmaid (credited as Dora Rodgers)
 Dave Anderson as Townsman (uncredited)
 Edward F. Cline as Soldier (uncredited)
 Bobby Dunn as Inn Patron (uncredited)
 Billy Gilbert as Inn Patron
 Hank Mann as Soldier (uncredited)
 George Ovey as Young Sweetheart in Park (uncredited)
 Josef Swickard as Townsman (uncredited)

References

External links

1922 films
American silent feature films
Silent American comedy films
American black-and-white films
Films directed by Mack Sennett
Triangle Film Corporation films
1922 comedy films
1920s American films